The Utstein Style is a set of guidelines for uniform reporting of cardiac arrest. The Utstein Style was first proposed for emergency medical services in 1991.  The name derives from a 1990 conference of the European Society of Cardiology, the European Academy
of Anesthesiology, the European Society for Intensive Care Medicine, and related national societies, held at the Utstein Abbey on the island of Mosterøy, Norway.

Examples of cardiac arrest registries based on the Utstein Style include the Cardiac Arrest Registry to Enhance Survival, Resuscitation Outcomes Consortium, Save Hearts in Arizona Registry and Education, and the National Registry of CardioPulmonary Resuscitation.

References
 Jacobs I, Nadkarni V, Bahr J; et al. [ --[BROKEN LINK http://jama.ama-assn.org/cgi/ijlink?linkType=ABST&journalCode=circulationaha&resid=110/21/3385]-- Cardiac arrest and cardiopulmonary resuscitation outcome reports: update and simplification of the Utstein templates for resuscitation registries: a statement for healthcare professionals from a task force of the International Liaison Committee on Resuscitation (American Heart Association, European Resuscitation Council, Australian Resuscitation Council, New Zealand Resuscitation Council, Heart and Stroke Foundation of Canada, InterAmerican Heart Foundation, Resuscitation Councils of Southern Africa).] Circulation. 2004;110(21):3385-3397.
 Cummins RO, Chamberlain DA, Abramson NS, Allen M, Baskett PJ, Becker L, Bossaert L, Delooz HH, Dick WF, Eisenberg MS, et al. --[ BROKEN LINK  --  Recommended guidelines for uniform reporting of data from out-of-hospital cardiac arrest: the Utstein Style. A statement for health professionals from a task force of the American Heart Association, the European Resuscitation Council, the Heart and Stroke Foundation of Canada, and the Australian Resuscitation Council.] Circulation.  1991; 84: 960–975.
 Cummins RO, Chamberlain D, Hazinski MF, Nadkarni V, Kloeck W, Kramer E, Becker L, Robertson C, Koster R, Zaritsky A, et al. Recommended guidelines for reviewing, reporting, and conducting research on in-hospital resuscitation: the in-hospital ‘Utstein style.’ American Heart Association. Circulation.  1997; 95: 2213–2239.
 Zaritsky A, Nadkarni V, Hazinski MF, Foltin G, Quan L, Wright J, Fiser D, Zideman D, O’Malley P, Chameides L. Recommended guidelines for uniform reporting of pediatric advanced life support: the Pediatric Utstein Style. A statement for healthcare professionals from a task force of the American Academy of Pediatrics, the American Heart Association, and the European Resuscitation Council. Resuscitation.  1995; 30: 95–115.

Cardiology
Emergency medicine
Epidemiology
Emergency medical services